is a passenger railway station located in the city of Ōtsu, Shiga Prefecture, Japan, operated by the private railway company Keihan Electric Railway.

Lines

Station layout
The station consists of two opposed unnumbered side platforms connected by a level crossing. There is no station building and the station is unattended.  The station is located next to Nishigori Depot. Trains terminating at this station return to the east side platform from the through track to Sakamoto in the north of the station to start for Ishiyamadera because there is no siding track at the station, and the east side platform serves the trains starting from this station for Sakamoto because there is no connection from the depot to the west side platform for Sakamoto.

Platforms

Adjacent stations

History
It was renamed to its present name on February 1m 1941, but reverted to its original name from January 8 to July 10, 1948.

Passenger statistics
In fiscal 2018, the station was used by an average of 701 passengers daily (boarding passengers only).

Surrounding area
 Omi Shrine
Otsu Nishikori Post Office
Ōmi Ōtsukyō Nishigōri Site
Yanagasaki Lakeside Park

See also
List of railway stations in Japan

References

External links

Keihan official home page

Railway stations in Shiga Prefecture
Stations of Keihan Electric Railway
Railway stations in Japan opened in 1927
Railway stations in Ōtsu